A charter of novodamus, in Scottish feudal land law, is a fresh grant of lands to the grantee. It is usually granted to make some change in the incidents of tenure of land already granted, or to resolve doubts about the grant or its terms.

See also
 Director of Chancery

Sources

The Oxford Companion to Law, ed David Walker, 1978, page 894

Scots law
Feudalism in Scotland
Land law
Scots property law